Kajang Municipal Council (Malay: Majlis Perbandaran Kajang, Jawi: مجليس ڤربندرن كاجڠ) is the local government authority serving Hulu Langat District in Selangor, Malaysia.

History
The Kajang Municipal Council was granted municipal status on 1 January 1997. Previously it was known as Hulu Langat District Council (Majlis Daerah Hulu Langat, MDHL).

Councillors 
Session:2020-2022

Headquarters
The headquarters of Kajang Municipal Council is located at Jalan Cempaka Kuning in the city centre of Kajang, near the  MRT station.

Administration Area

MPKJ's municipal area covers the entire Hulu Langat region, except Ampang Jaya and Pandan Indah, which were ceded in 1992 to the Ampang Jaya Municipal Council. Major cities and towns in the area include Kajang, Semenyih, Bandar Baru Bangi, Cheras, Hulu Langat town and Dusun Tua.

See also
 List of local governments in Malaysia

References

External links 
MPKj official web site 

Municipal Council
Local government in Selangor
Municipal councils in Malaysia